George Vernon (1856–1902) was an English cricketer.

George Vernon may also refer to:

 George Vernon (MP for Derby and Derbyshire) (c. 1503–1565), Member of Parliament (MP) for Derby and Derbyshire
 George Vernon (MP for Bridgnorth) (1575–1639), MP for Bridgnorth
 George Vernon, member of the King's Men personnel 1617–30

See also
 George Venables-Vernon (disambiguation)